Swe–ba is ward under Viswema, Nagaland located along the Asian Highway 1 and also the NH2.

The John Government Higher Secondary School and Community Health Center, Viswema are located under this ward.

Demographics
Swe–ba is located in Jakhama sub-division of Kohima district, Nagaland with a total of 90 residence. It has a population of 388 as per Population Census 2011.

References

Viswema
Villages in Kohima district